These are the results of the girls' K1 slalom at the 2010 Summer Youth Olympics. It took place at the Marina Reservoir. Time Trial Round was on August 24, 2010. First elimination round, repechage and third round took place on August 24, and quarterfinals, semifinals and medals rounds were on August 25.

Medalists

Time Trial

First round
The winners and the fastest loser advanced to the 3rd round. Losers raced at the repechages.

Match 1

Match 2

Match 3

Match 4

Match 5

Match 6

Match 7

Match 8

Match 9

Match 10

Match 11

Repechage
The fastest 3 boats advanced to the 3rd round.

Repechage 1

Repechage 2

Repechage 3

Repechage 4

Repechage 5

Third round
The winners advanced to the 4th round.

Match 1

Match 2

Match 3

Match 4

Match 5

Match 6

Match 7

Match 8

Quarterfinals

Match 1

Match 2

Match 3

Match 4

Semifinals

Match 1

Match 2

Finals

Match 1

Match 2

References
Time Trial
First Round
Repechage
Third Round
Quarterfinals
Semifinals
Finals

Canoeing at the 2010 Summer Youth Olympics